Mariya Koryttseva and Darya Kustova were the defending champions, but Kustova chose not to participate, and only Koryttseva competed that year.
Koryttseva partnered with Galina Voskoboeva, but lost in the semifinals to Sara Errani and Nuria Llagostera Vives

Sara Errani and Nuria Llagostera Vives won in the final 2–6, 7–6(7–1), 10–4, against Alla Kudryavtseva and Anastasia Pavlyuchenkova.

Seeds

Draw

Draw

External links
Draw

Doubles
Internazionali Femminili di Palermo